The 2013 NASCAR Sprint All-Star Race was a NASCAR Sprint Cup Series stock car race held on May 18, 2013, at Charlotte Motor Speedway in Concord, North Carolina. Contested over 90 laps, the it was the second exhibition race of the 2013 Sprint Cup Series season. Jimmie Johnson of Hendrick Motorsports took his record fourth All-Star Race victory, while Joey Logano finished second. Kyle Busch, Kasey Kahne, and Kurt Busch rounded out the top five.

Report

Background

The track's turns are banked at twenty-four degrees, while the front stretch, the location of the finish line, is five degrees. The back stretch, opposite of the front, also had a five degree banking. The racetrack has seats for 134,000 spectators.

A total of 23 drivers were entered for the Sprint Showdown, while 19 different drivers were eligible to participate in the All-Star Race, including race winners from last season through the 2013 Bojangles' Southern 500 at Darlington Raceway and previous All-Star race winners from the past 10 years. The drivers who finished first and second in the Sprint Showdown, a 40-lap  preliminary race, were also eligible to compete in the race, as well as the Sprint fan vote winner. The race was 90 laps long, separated into five segments: four segments of 20 laps and a final segment of 10 laps.  Following the fourth segment, drivers were repositioned by their average finish in the previous four segments to determine what position they would enter pit road. A mandatory four-tire pit stop was between the final two segments, while pitting between the 20 lap segments was optional.

Practice and qualifying

Sprint Showdown
Martin Truex Jr. started on pole, but Jamie McMurray passed him in turn two on the first lap. McMurray led all 20 laps to win the first segment after holding off a mid-segment charge by Truex. Ricky Stenhouse Jr. finished the segment in third, followed by Juan Pablo Montoya and Paul Menard. During the competition caution between segments, Casey Mears stayed out as the rest of the field came to pit road. McMurray took two tires and restarted second. He quickly re-took the lead and pulled away from the field as Stenhouse and Truex (who took four tires) tried to catch up. Stenhouse slightly closed in on McMurray over the next few laps while Truex and Jeff Burton battled for third. McMurray once again led all 20 laps to win segment two and advance into the All-Star Race. Stenhouse finished in second to advance as well. Burton, Menard, Truex, and Montoya rounded out the top six. Danica Patrick, who finished ninth, won the fan vote to advance to the All-Star Race.

NASCAR Sprint All-Star Race
Carl Edwards started on pole and choose the outside lane, with Kurt Busch starting second. Busch took the lead from Edwards in turn three on lap one as Brad Keselowski had transmission failure at the end of lap two. The first caution flag waved on lap eight for a rain shower and 11 of the remaining 21 cars (including Mark Martin, Tony Stewart, Dale Earnhardt Jr., Danica Patrick, and Jimmie Johnson) made pit stops. The field ran under caution for five laps, until the red flag came out on lap 13 and the jet dryers were called onto the track. After a 41-minute red flag, the field took the restart on lap 16. Kurt Busch continued to lead and won the first 20-lap segment. He was followed by Kyle Busch, Clint Bowyer, Carl Edwards, and Kasey Kahne.

Following the caution, Kurt Busch took the green flag with Kyle Busch on his outside. Kyle quickly moved around Kurt in turn two, but Kurt came back alongside Kyle in turn three. This allowed Clint Bowyer to pass them both and pull away with the lead, while Kyle and Kurt settled in second and third, respectively. On lap 25, Ricky Stenhouse Jr. bounced off the frontstretch wall and into Mark Martin, who was sent spinning into the infield, to bring out the third caution. On the restart, Kyle Busch passed Bowyer for the lead in turn three. Busch led the next 12 laps to win the second segment, followed by Bowyer, Edwards, Kurt Busch, and Jimmie Johnson. During the caution, all drivers came down pit road, with the exception of Bowyer, Edwards, and Martin. On the restart, Bowyer continued to lead over Edwards and Kyle Busch. Edwards then quickly faded, leaving Busch in second and Johnson in third place. On lap 44, Kyle Busch passed Bowyer for the lead and pulled away, leaving Kurt Busch, Bowyer, Johnson, and Dale Earnhardt Jr. to battle for the second position. Bowyer then fell back, leaving Kurt Busch in second, Johnson in third, and Earnhardt in fourth. Kyle Busch would lead the last 17 laps of the third 20-lap segment to win the segment (his second segment win). He was followed by Kurt Busch, Johnson, Earnhardt, and Joey Logano. The whole field came onto pit road during the caution (with some taking two tires and others taking four) and Kasey Kahne rolled off of pit road first, followed by Kevin Harvick, Greg Biffle, Denny Hamlin, and Kyle Busch.

At the start of the fourth 20-lap segment, Harvick nosed ahead of Kahne, but Kahne was able to stay in front of Harvick and pull away. As a result of everyone shuffling on the restart, Kyle Busch fell back several positions but regained to sixth. The fifth caution waved on lap 65 for debris resulting from contact between Biffle and Earnhardt. Kahne led on the restart (lap 71), followed by Kurt Busch, Harvick, and Johnson. Busch passed Kahne for the lead on lap 72 and started to pull away as Kahne and Johnson battled for second. Busch led the last nine laps of segment four to win the segment (his second segment win), followed by Kahne, Johnson, Kyle Busch, and Matt Kenseth.

Due to a new stipulation, the field was shuffled in order of their average finishes in the first four segments before the mandatory pit stop. This put Kurt Busch, Kyle Busch, Kahne, Johnson, and Logano as the first five onto pit road. Kahne came out first, followed by Johnson, Kyle Busch, Logano, and Kurt Busch. On the restart, Kahne and Johnson ran side-by-side for two laps until Johnson finally cleared Kahne and moved away. Johnson sped away over the last eight laps to win his second All-Star Race in a row (becoming the only driver to win four All-Star races). Logano finished second, followed by Kyle Busch, Kahne, and Kurt Busch. Hamlin, Earnhardt, Jamie McMurray, Matt Kenseth, and Edwards rounded out the top ten.

Results

Showdown qualifying

Showdown results

All-Star Race qualifying

All-Star Race results

References

NASCAR Sprint All-Star Race
NASCAR Sprint All-Star Race
NASCAR Sprint All-Star Race
NASCAR races at Charlotte Motor Speedway
NASCAR All-Star Race